Henry Threadgill (born February 15, 1944) is an American composer, saxophonist and flautist. He came to prominence in the 1970s leading ensembles rooted in jazz but with unusual instrumentation and often incorporating other genres of music. He has performed and recorded with several ensembles: Air, Aggregation Orb, Make a Move, the seven-piece Henry Threadgill Sextett, the twenty-piece Society Situation Dance Band, Very Very Circus, X-75, and Zooid.

He was awarded the 2016 Pulitzer Prize for Music for his album In for a Penny, In for a Pound, which premiered at Roulette Intermedium on December 4, 2014.

Career
Threadgill performed as a percussionist in his high-school marching band before taking up baritone saxophone, alto saxophone, and flute. He studied at the American Conservatory of Music in Chicago, majoring in piano, flute, and composition. He studied piano with Gail Quillman and composition with Stella Roberts. He was an original member of the Experimental Band, a precursor to the Association for the Advancement of Creative Musicians (AACM) in his hometown of Chicago, and worked under the guidance of Muhal Richard Abrams, before leaving to tour with a gospel band. In 1967, he enlisted in the U.S. Army, playing with a rock band in Vietnam during the Vietnam War in 1967 and 1968. He was discharged in 1969.

After returning to Chicago, Threadgill joined AACM members bassist Fred Hopkins and drummer Steve McCall in a trio which would eventually become the group Air. He moved to New York City, where he formed his first group, X-75, a nonet consisting of four reed players, four bass players, and a vocalist.

In the early 1980s, Threadgill created his first critically acclaimed ensemble as a leader, the Henry Threadgill Sextet (actually a septet; he counted the two drummers as a single percussion unit), which released three albums on About Time Records. After a hiatus, he formed New Air with Pheeroan akLaff, replacing Steve McCall on drums, and reformed the Henry Threadgill Sextett (with two t's at the end). The six albums the group recorded feature some of his most accessible work, notably on the album You Know the Number. The group's unorthodox instrumentation included two drummers, double bass, cello, trumpet, and trombone, in addition to Threadgill's alto saxophone and flute. Among the players were drummers akLaff, John Betsch, Reggie Nicholson and Newman Baker; bassist Fred Hopkins; cellist Diedre Murray; trumpeters Rasul Siddik and Ted Daniels; cornetist Olu Dara; and trombonists Ray Anderson, Frank Lacy, Bill Lowe, and Craig Harris.

During the 1990s, Threadgill pushed the musical boundaries even further with his ensemble Very Very Circus. The group consisted of two tubas, two electric guitars, a trombone or French horn, and drums. With this group he explored more complex and highly structured forms of composition, augmenting the group with Latin percussion, French horn, violin, accordion, vocalists, and exotic instruments. He composed and recorded with other unusual instruments, such as a flute quartet (Flute Force Four, a one-time project from 1990); and combinations of four cellos and four acoustic guitars (on Makin' a Move).

He was signed by Columbia Records for three albums. Since the dissolution of Very Very Circus, Threadgill has continued in his iconoclastic ways with ensembles such as Make a Move and Zooid. Zooid, currently a sextet with tuba (Jose Davila), acoustic guitar (Liberty Ellman), cello (Christopher Hoffman), drums (Elliot Kavee) and bass guitar (Stomu Takeishi), has been the primary vehicle for Threadgill's compositions in the 2000s.

In 2018, Threadgill composed the string quartet "Sixfivetwo" for the Kronos Quartet, which they recorded as part of their "Fifty for the Future" project.

Awards and honors
In 2016, Threadgill's composition In for a Penny, In for a Pound was awarded the Pulitzer Prize for Music.

In July 2016, he received the Vietnam Veterans of America Excellence in the Arts Award, at the VVA National Leadership Conference in Tucson.

"Run Silent, Run Deep, Run Loud, Run High" (conducted by Hale Smith) and "Mix for Orchestra" (conducted by Dennis Russell Davies), were both premiered at the Brooklyn Academy of Music in 1987 and 1993 respectively. He has had commissions from Mordine & Company in 1971 and 1989, from Carnegie Hall for "Quintet for Strings and Woodwinds" in 1983 and 1985, the New York Shakespeare Festival in 1985, Bang on a Can All-Stars in 1995, "Peroxide" commissioned by the Miller Theatre Columbia University in 2003 for "Aggregation Orb", a commission from the Talujon Percussion Ensemble in 2008, a piece "Fly Fliegen Volar" commissioned and premiered at the Saalfelden Jazz Festival with the Junge Philharmonie Salzburg Orchestra in 2007, a premier of the piece "Mc Guffins" with Zooid at the Biennale Festival in Italy in 2004.

In October 2020, the National Endowment for the Arts (NEA) announced Threadgill as one of four recipients of the NEA Jazz Masters Fellowships, celebrated in an online concert and show on April 22, 2021. Awarded in recognition of lifetime achievement, the honor is bestowed on individuals who have made significant contributions to the art form. The other 2021 recipients were Terri Lyne Carrington, Albert "Tootie" Heath, and Phil Schaap.

Personal life 
Threadgill was born in Chicago. He studied piano, flute, and composition at the American Conservatory of Music in Chicago, and Governors State University, in University Park, Illinois. He was a member of the US Army Concert Band, and served in Vietnam. He is married to recording artist and ethnomusicologist Senti Toy, also known as Sentienla Toy Threadgill.

Discography

As leader/co-leader
Air
 1975: Air Song (Why Not)
 1976: Air Raid (Why Not)
 1977: Live Air (Black Saint)
 1977: Air Time (Nessa)
 1978: Open Air Suit (Arista/Novus)
 1978: Montreux Suisse (Arista/Novus)
 1979: Air Lore (Arista/Novus)
 1980: Air Mail (Black Saint)
 1982: 80° Below '82 (Antilles)
 1983: Live at Montreal International Jazz Festival (as New Air) (Black Saint)
 1986: Air Show No. 1 (as New Air with Cassandra Wilson) (Black Saint)

X-75
 1979: X-75 Volume 1 (Arista/Novus) 
Henry Threadgill Sextett
 1982: When Was That? (About Time)
 1983: Just the Facts and Pass the Bucket (About Time)
 1984: Subject to Change (About Time)
 1987: You Know the Number (Arista/Novus)
 1988: Easily Slip Into Another World (Arista/Novus)
 1989: Rag, Bush and All (Arista/Novus)

Very Very Circus
 1990: Spirit of Nuff...Nuff (Black Saint)
 1991: Live at Koncepts (Taylor Made)
 1993: Too Much Sugar for a Dime (Axiom)
 1993: Song Out of My Trees (Black Saint)
 1994: Carry the Day (Columbia)
 1995: Makin' a Move (Columbia)

Make a Move
 1996: Where's Your Cup? (Columbia)
 2001: Everybodys Mouth's a Book (Pi)

Zooid
 2001: Up Popped the Two Lips (Pi)
 2005: Pop Start the Tape, StoP (Hardedge)
 2009: This Brings Us to Volume 1 (Pi)
 2010: This Brings Us to Volume 2 (Pi )
 2012: Tomorrow Sunny / The Revelry, Spp (Pi)
 2015: In for a Penny, In for a Pound (Pi)

Ensemble Double Up
 2016: Old Locks and Irregular Verbs (Pi)
 2018: Double Up, Plays Double Up Plus (Pi)

14 or 15 Kestra: Agg
 2018: Dirt… And More Dirt (Pi)

As sideman
With Muhal Richard Abrams
 Young at Heart/Wise in Time (1969)
 1-OQA+19 (1977)
With Anthony Braxton
 For Trio (Arista, 1978)
With Chico Freeman
 Morning Prayer (Whynot, 1976)
With Roscoe Mitchell
 Nonaah (Nessa, 1977)
 L-R-G / The Maze / S II Examples (Nessa, 1978)
With Frank Walton
 Reality (1978)
With David Murray
 Ming (1980)
 Home (1981)
 Murray's Steps (1982)
With Material / Bill Laswell
 Memory Serves (1981)
 The Third Power (1991)
With Sly & Robbie / Bill Laswell
 Rhythm Killers (1987)
With Carlinhos Brown / Bill Laswell
 Bahia Black: Ritual Beating System (1991)
With Leroy Jenkins
 Themes & Improvisations on the Blues (1992)
With Kip Hanrahan
 Darn It! (1992) with Paul Haines
 A Thousand Nights and a Night (Shadow Night – 1) (1996)
With Billy Bang
 Hip Hop Be Bop (1993) with Craig Harris
 Vietnam: Reflections (2004)
With Sola
 Blues in the East (1994)
With Abiodun Oyewole
 25 Years (1996)
With Flute Force Four (Threadgill, Pedro Eustache, Melecio Magdaluyo, James Newton)
 Flutistry (1990, released 1997)
With Douglas Ewart
 Angles of Entrance (1998)
With Jean-Paul Bourelly
 Boom Bop (2000)
 Trance Atlantic – Boom Bop II (2001)
With Ejigayehu "Gigi" Shibabaw
 Gigi (2001)
With Lucky Peterson
 Black Midnight Sun (2002)
With Dafnis Prieto
 Absolute Quintet (2006)
With Wadada Leo Smith
 The Great Lakes Suites (2012, released 2014)
With Jack DeJohnette
 Made in Chicago (ECM, 2013 [2015]) with Muhal Richard Abrams, Larry Gray and Roscoe Mitchell

References

External links
 Tribute by Dave Kaufman
 Interview on Columbia University's radio station
 Interview
 Henry Threadgill unedited, Wire interview, July 2010
 Illustrated Discography by Lars Backstrom

1944 births
Living people
Musicians from Chicago
American jazz flautists
American male saxophonists
Avant-garde jazz musicians
Jazz alto saxophonists
United States Army personnel of the Vietnam War
Columbia Records artists
Pi Recordings artists
Pulitzer Prize for Music winners
Air (free jazz trio) members
21st-century American saxophonists
Jazz musicians from Illinois
21st-century American male musicians
American male jazz musicians
United States Army soldiers
20th-century African-American people
21st-century African-American musicians
21st-century flautists